It Happens Every Day is a 1930 German film directed by Hans Natge and Adolf Trotz.

The film's sets were designed by the art director Hermann Warm.

Cast

References

Bibliography

External links 
 

1930 films
1930 drama films
Films of the Weimar Republic
German drama films
1930s German-language films
Films directed by Adolf Trotz
German black-and-white films
1930s German films